Henry Fitz was an American engineer, scientist, locksmith, optician, and inventor.

Early life
Fitz was born in Newburyport, Massachusetts on December 31, 1808.

Later life and death
Fitz’s telescope business was highly profitable, so in 1863, he started construction of a new house. However, he died suddenly on November 7, 1863. Obituaries report that his demise was from tuberculosis. Before his final illness, he was about to sail for Europe to select a glass for a  telescope and to procure patents for a camera involving a new form of lens.

Personal life 

Fitz married Julia Ann Wells of Southold, Long Island in June 1844.

References

Sources

1808 births
1863 deaths
People from Newburyport, Massachusetts
Telescope manufacturers